RKS may refer to:

 Designation for transmission facilities in Czech, for example RKS Liblice 1
 Kosovo, license plate code
 Remote keyless system
 Rock Springs - Sweetwater County Airport
 Rotterdamse Kunststichting (RKS)